Alleppy Coir refers to the Coir products made in Ambalappuzha and Cherthala Taluks of Alappuzha district, in the state of Kerala, India. Coir production of this region dates back to as early as 1859. The World Trade Organization (WTO) granted Geographical Indication status to "Alleppey Coir" in 2007.

Main Products

 Coir Bed
 Coir Mat
 Coir Carpet

History

The production of Coir in Alappuzha dates back to centuries. There are mentions about coir in travelogues of Arabs and in Mythology like Ramayana.

The production of coir in Alappuzha were non mechanized and unorganized until the mid 19th century. The first coir factory in India at Alleppey Darragh Smail & Company was established in 1859 by an Irish American entrepreneur James Darragh. Coir was called Cocoa Mats in American English and Darragh Smail & Co. Ltd. had their office and salesrooms at 177, Water Street, New York City. 
In the following one century many prominent European firms manufactured and exported coir from Alappuzha. The prominent ones were Aspinwall &Co., Pierce Lesley &Co. Ltd., William Goodacre & Sons India Pvt Ltd., Volkart Brothers etc.

In 1940's following the Indian Independence movement and Labour movement in Travancore the European companies exited and decentralization of coir production happened. Presently Coir Board of India is the prime regulatory and promotion body that encourage coir production.

See also

 List of geographical indications in India

References

Geographical indications in Kerala
Agriculture in Kerala
Culture of Alappuzha district